Thomas Jordan Trevelyan (born March 6, 1984) is a Canadian of Cornish descent professional ice hockey player for the Augsburger Panther of the Deutsche Eishockey Liga (DEL).

Playing career
Trevelyan was a 2006 graduate of Saint Lawrence University.  During his National Collegiate Athletic Association career, Trevelyan was named to the ECAC All-Star Team in 2005 and 2006, as well as being named the ECAC Player of the Year in 2006.  He was also named an NCAA First Team All-American in 2006.  On August 26, 2006 Trevelyan signed a multi-year entry-level contract with the Boston Bruins. In 2008, Trevelyan was invited to training camp by the Anaheim Ducks, and spent the season in the American Hockey League (AHL) with Ducks affiliate the Iowa Chops.

On July 21, 2009, Trevelyan signed a one-year contract with the Worcester Sharks. Prior to the 2009–10 season he was invited to Worcester's NHL affiliate the San Jose Sharks training camp. Failing to make the Sharks' roster, Trevelyan returned to the AHL and led Worcester with 28 goals in just 63 games before leading Worcester with 4 goals in the playoffs. After an impressive season with the Sharks, T.J. was then signed to a one-year contract with the San Jose Sharks on May 28, 2010.

On August 2, 2011, Trevelyan left North America and signed a contract with European team, Augsburger Panther of the DEL.

Career statistics

Awards and honours

References

External links 
 

1984 births
Augsburger Panther players
Canadian ice hockey left wingers
Canadian people of Cornish descent
Ice hockey people from Ontario
Iowa Stars players
Living people
Long Beach Ice Dogs (ECHL) players
Providence Bruins players
Sportspeople from Mississauga
St. Lawrence Saints men's ice hockey players
Worcester Sharks players
Canadian expatriate ice hockey players in Germany
AHCA Division I men's ice hockey All-Americans